Castra Martis Hill (Halm Kastra Martis \'h&lm 'kas-tra 'mar-tis\) is a 453 m hill near Leslie Hill in Livingston Island.  The peak was named after the Roman settlement of Castra Martis, ancestor of the present town of Kula in Northwestern Bulgaria.

First ascent by the Bulgarians Lyubomir Ivanov and Doychin Vasilev from Camp Academia on 25 December 2004, as part of Tangra 2004/05 survey.

Location

Maps
 L.L. Ivanov et al. Antarctica: Livingston Island and Greenwich Island, South Shetland Islands. Scale 1:100000 topographic map. Sofia: Antarctic Place-names Commission of Bulgaria, 2005.
 L.L. Ivanov. Antarctica: Livingston Island and Greenwich, Robert, Snow and Smith Islands. Scale 1:120000 topographic map.  Troyan: Manfred Wörner Foundation, 2009.

References
 Castra Martis Hill. SCAR Composite Gazetteer of Antarctica
 Bulgarian Antarctic Gazetteer. Antarctic Place-names Commission. (details in Bulgarian, basic data in English)

External links
 Castra Martis Hill. Copernix satellite image

Hills of Livingston Island